Shisho may refer to:

Perilla frutescens var. crispa, an edible herb and ornamental plant
Shisho Station, train station in Maizuru, Kyoto Prefecture, Japan